Gūnbazak (also Romanized as Gunbazak) is a village in Dodangeh-ye Sofla Rural District, Ziaabad District, Takestan County, Qazvin Province, Iran. At the 2006 census, its population was 59, in 16 families.
It is an Azerbaijani Turkish-speaking village

References 

Populated places in Takestan County